Stuart Bennett (born in Northern Ireland) is an combined Irish international lawn and indoor bowler.

Bowls career
In 2012, Bennett became a National champion after winning the fours at the Irish National Bowls Championships bowling for the Belmont Bowls Club. In 2015 he won a bronze medal at the European Championships in Israel. In 2019 he was in the Irish team that won the Home International Bowls Championships.

He was due to make his debut at the World Championships during the 2021 World Indoor Bowls Championship competing in the singles and pairs but the event was cancelled. He did gain consolation however by winning a second National fours title in September 2021.

Personal life
He is a civil servant by trade.

References

Irish male lawn bowls players
Male lawn bowls players from Northern Ireland
Living people
Year of birth missing (living people)